Sikeå is a locality situated in Robertsfors Municipality, Västerbotten County, Sweden. Together with the locality Legdeå, which is nearby, there are 360 persons living in the area. Sikeå has a camping for caravans, a handball team in division 1 north (Sikeå SK) and also the smallest fire station in Sweden. Sikeå is situated 4 km from Robertsfors.

Populated places in Västerbotten County